Allendale, Nova Scotia  is a community of the Municipality of the District of Shelburne in the Canadian province of Nova Scotia on Nova Scotia Trunk 3. It was named after James Allen.

References

Communities in Shelburne County, Nova Scotia